The Council of Government of Monaco is the Prince's governing body.
It consists of six members:

Minister of State, who chairs the council, and the five members (four counsellors and one delegate); he also has voting rights, and has control of both the police and military.

Counsellor for Internal Affairs,
Counsellor for Finance and Economy,
Counsellor for Public Works, the Environment and Urban Planning,
Counsellor for Social Affairs and health,
Counsellor for Foreign Relations and Cooperation. 
The Council debates projects and bills proposed to the Prince by the other governmental councils, executive ordinances approved by the Prince, the Minister of State's ministerial orders, and other miscellaneous policy.

Politics of Monaco
Political organisations based in Monaco
Monaco
Government of Monaco